Dar Deh or Dardeh may refer to:

Dardeh, Alborz
Dar Deh, Tehran